Humza Haroon Yousaf (born 7 April 1985) is a Scottish politician serving as Cabinet Secretary for Health and Social Care since 2021. He is the first South Asian and first Muslim cabinet minister in the Scottish Government. A member of the Scottish National Party (SNP), he has been the Member of the Scottish Parliament (MSP) for Glasgow Pollok since 2016, having previously represented Glasgow region from 2011 to 2016. On 18 February 2023, Yousaf declared his candidacy for SNP leadership and First Minister of Scotland.

Born and raised in Glasgow, Yousaf attended the University of Glasgow, where he earned an MA in politics in 2007. After graduating he worked as a parliamentary assistant for Bashir Ahmad, the first Muslim MSP, until his death two years later. Yousaf went on to work for First Minister Alex Salmond and Deputy First Minister Nicola Sturgeon, before being elected to the Scottish Parliament in 2011. The following year, Yousaf was appointed the Minister for External Affairs and International Development under Salmond's government. When Sturgeon succeeded Salmond as First Minister in 2014, she appointed him the Minister for Europe and International Development, before appointing him the Minister for Transport and the Islands in 2016. As part of a wider cabinet reshuffle of Sturgeon's second administration, she appointed Yousaf to the Scottish Cabinet as the Justice Secretary. In 2021, amid the COVID-19 pandemic in Scotland, he was appointed the Health Secretary, task forced with the responsibility of the COVID-19 vaccination programme and the NHS' recovery.

Following the announcement of Sturgeon's intention to resign as the leader of the SNP and First Minister of Scotland, Yousaf declared his candidacy for the 2023 leadership election.

Early life

Birth and family background 
Humza Haroon Yousaf was born in the city of Glasgow on 7 April 1985. The son of first-generation immigrants, his father, Muzaffar Yousaf, was born in Mian Channu, Pakistan, and emigrated to the city with his family in the 1960s, eventually working as an accountant. His paternal grandfather worked in the Singer sewing machine factory in Clydebank in the 1960s. Yousaf's mother, Shaaista Bhutta, was born in Kenya to a family of South Asian descent. Her family experienced violent attacks on several occasions for being seen as taking jobs from natives and they later emigrated to Scotland.

Education 

He was one of two ethnic minorities to attend his primary school. Yousaf was privately educated at Hutchesons' Grammar School, an independent school in Glasgow, where his Modern Studies lessons inspired him to become involved in politics. He described 9/11 the "day that changed the world and for me" when he was 16 years old. Prior to the attack, Yousaf was close to two pupils who he sat next to in his registration class, but after the attack in New York, they asked Yousaf questions "why do Muslims hate America?"

Yousaf's parents favoured careers such as doctor, dentist, pharmacist, accountant and lawyer for him, but he opted to study politics at the University of Glasgow. Whilst at university, Yousaf was President of the Glasgow University Muslim Students Association as well as a prominent figure involved in student politics in the Students' Representative Council. Yousaf graduated in 2007 with a Master of Arts (MA).

Early political involvement 
From an early age, Yousaf was involved in community work, ranging from youth organisations to charity fundraising. He was the volunteer media spokesperson for the charity Islamic Relief, worked for community radio for twelve years and on a project which provided food packages to homeless people and asylum seekers in Glasgow.

Yousaf joined the Scottish National Party (SNP) in 2005, while studying at Glasgow university. Speeches by then-party leader Alex Salmond and anti-war activist Rose Gentle speaking out against the Iraq war convinced him that independence would be the only way for Scotland to avoid going to war. He started campaigning extensively for the SNP, including for the 2007 Scottish parliament election, which resulted in the first SNP government in Scotland and Yousaf's first job in the Scottish parliament.

Early career 
In 2006, Yousaf worked in an O2 call centre, before working as a parliamentary assistant for Bashir Ahmad, from Ahmad's election as Scotland's first Muslim MSP in 2007 until Ahmad's death two years later. Ahmad was a personal influence. Yousaf then worked as parliamentary assistant for a few other MSPs including Anne McLaughlin, Nicola Sturgeon and Alex Salmond, who was then First Minister. Before his election to the Scottish Parliament, he worked in the SNP's headquarters as a Communications Officer.

In 2008, whilst working as an aide, Yousaf took part in the International Visitor Leadership Program, a professional exchange run by the US State Department. He was awarded the “Future Force of Politics” at the Young Scottish Minority Ethnic Awards in 2009, which was presented to him in Glasgow City Chambers.

Political career

Election to Holyrood

In May 2011, Yousaf was elected to the Scottish Parliament as an additional member for the Glasgow region. At just 26 years of age, he was the youngest MSP to be elected to the Scottish Parliament. When being sworn in, he took his oath in English then Urdu, reflecting his Scottish-Pakistani identity; he was dressed in a traditional sherwani decorated with a Partick Thistle tartan touch and a plaid draped over his shoulder. Yousaf was appointed to the Justice and Public Audit Committees. On 25 May 2011 he was appointed as a Parliamentary Liaison Officer to the Office of the First Minister, remaining in this post until 4 September 2012.

Junior ministerial career (2012–2018) 

On 5 September 2012, First Minister Alex Salmond appointed Yousaf as Minister for External Affairs and International Development, responsible for external affairs, international development; fair trade policy and diaspora. This junior ministerial appointment saw him working under the Cabinet Secretary for Culture and External Affairs. He was the first Scottish Asian and Muslim to be appointed as a minister to the Scottish Government.

In October 2013, he outlined the SNP's plans to set out the United Nations target for overseas aid at 0.7% in an independent Scotland and accused the UK Government of going back on its promise in the 2010 coalition agreement to guarantee that level of spending. Yousaf also outlined that an independent Scotland would "add a progressive voice to global issues promoting peace, equality and fairness" and added independence would be "achieved through a democratic, peaceful means without a single drop of blood being spilled and engaging with all the diverse communities that make up our rich tapestry in Scotland.".

When Nicola Sturgeon became First Minister in November 2014, she kept Yousaf as a junior minister, although the name of the position he held was changed to the Minister for Europe and International Development.

On 18 May 2016, he was appointed as Minister for Transport and the Islands following the formation of Sturgeon's second government.

Cabinet Secretary for Justice (2018–2021) 
On 26 June 2018, Sturgeon announced her intention to perform a cabinet reshuffle of her second government. She promoted Yousaf to the Scottish Cabinet to serve as Cabinet Secretary for Justice, succeeding Michael Matheson.

Hate Crime Bill 
One of his flagship policies was the Hate Crime and Public Order (Scotland) Bill, which he promised would streamline existing legislation as well as add additional protections to persecuted minorities while maintaining rights to freedom of speech and freedom of expression. The bill has been criticised by the Catholic Church, the National Secular Society as well as writers, and in September 2020 it was amended to remove prosecution for cases of unintentionally stirring up hate, which could theoretically include libraries stocking contentious books. In October 2020, Yousaf said that the exception to the Public Order Act 1986 which allows people to use otherwise illegal language in their own homes should be abolished.

Cabinet Secretary for Health and Social Care (2021–present) 

In the 2021 Scottish Parliament election, Yousaf was re-elected as the MSP for the Glasgow Pollok constituency. The SNP fell two seats short of an overall majority in the election, but remained the largest party, with more than double the seats of the Scottish Conservatives. Sturgeon announced her intention to form a third administration and appointed Yousaf as the Cabinet Secretary for Health and Social Care, succeeding Jeane Freeman, who stepped down at the election.

COVID-19 pandemic 

Yousaf entered office amidst the ongoing COVID-19 pandemic. In June 2021 he said that ten children up to the age of nine had been admitted to Scottish hospitals in the previous week "because of Covid". Professor Steve Turner, Scotland officer for the Royal College of Paediatrics and Child Health, contradicted him and said that children’s wards were “not seeing a rise in cases with Covid”. He added that the children in question had been hospitalised for other reasons. Yousaf clarified his statement and apologised for "any undue alarm".

In July, the World Health Organisation concluded that six out of Europe's ten virus hotspots were in Scotland. Tayside topped the list with 1,002 cases per 100,000 head of population over the previous fortnight. The Scottish Government was accused of being ‘missing in action’ after it emerged that First Minister Nicola Sturgeon, Deputy First Minister John Swinney and Yousaf were all on holiday. Yousaf said he had promised to take his stepdaughter to Harry Potter World, tweeting that: "Most important job I have is being a good father, step-father & husband to my wife and kids. In the last seven months they’ve had virtually no time from me."

NHS waiting times 
In September 2021, the average waiting time for an ambulance in Scotland soared to six hours and Yousaf urged the public to "think twice" before they called 999. Scottish Conservative health spokesman Dr Sandesh Gulhane criticised the remark as “reckless messaging [that] could put lives at risk” and instead urged people to call an ambulance if they thought they needed one. Following reports of elderly Scots dying whilst waiting for an ambulance to arrive, Yousaf asked the Ministry of Defence for help and soldiers from the British Army were deployed to drive ambulances. Audit Scotland concluded that 500 people died in Scotland in 2021 due to delayed access to emergency treatment.

2023 SNP leadership election 

On 15 February 2023, Nicola Sturgeon announced her intention to resign the leadership of the Scottish National Party and First Minister of Scotland, which triggered a leadership election within the SNP to elect her successor. On 18 February, Yousaf declared his candidacy for leader in an interview with the Sunday Mail. He committed to challenging the UK Government over it's decision to block the Gender Recognition Reform (Scotland) Bill and stated he wanted to increase support for Scottish independence before delivering a referendum. Yousaf is seen as the continuity candidate, most aligned to Sturgeon's progressive policies and the party establishment. He has received the backing of many Sturgeon loyalists.

Yousaf launched his leadership campaign in Clydebank on 20 February. He said he was not "wedded" with using the next UK general election as a de facto referendum on Scottish independence and that one of the issues would be the inability for 16-year-olds and 17-year-olds to vote. Yousaf reaffirmed his commitment to defend the Scottish Parliament against the UK Government's Section 35 order, which aims to block the gender reform bill. He added that he could not pretend the bill had not "caused some division" within his party and stated he was "keen to work with those who have got real concerns".

Amid controversy over rival leadership candidate Kate Forbes' religious views, Yousaf, a practicing Muslim, said that he does not "legislate on the basis of [his] faith". Forbes stated that if she were an MSP during the Marriage and Civil Partnership (Scotland) Act 2014, she would've voted against same-sex marriage. Yousaf, who was an MSP at the time, was absent for the final vote, citing a ministerial engagement; however, he voted for the bill in earlier stages and vocally supported it throughout. If he won the election and was appointed First Minister, Yousaf says he would consider appointing Forbes to his cabinet, but, if she became First Minister, he may decline the offer to serve in her government if she changed the party's social policy positions towards a more conservative stance.

During the campaign, Yousaf faced questions on why he missed the Marriage and Civil Partnership (Scotland) Act 2014. He said at the time that he was meeting the Pakistani consul to discuss the case of a Scotsman facing the death penalty for blasphemy. Yousaf stated his support for the Gender Recognition Reform (Scotland) Bill, while his opponents Kate Forbes and Ash Regan opposed it.

Political positions 
Yousaf has been described as socially progressive. He is a Sturgeon loyalist and is in favour of continuing her socially progressive policies.

As a member of the SNP, a pro-Scottish independence party, Yousaf voted 'Yes' in the 2014 independence referendum. He has supported attempts for a second referendum. Yousaf has raised concerns over using the next UK general election as a de facto referendum as it would not allow 16 and 17-year-olds to vote. He also believes another referendum should only be held if there is clear public support, stating “It isn't good enough to have polls that put support for independence at 50 per cent or 51%.".

Yousaf said in 2023 that he was "firmly committed to equality for everyone" and has vocally supported same-sex marriage and gender reforms for trans people. In 2014 he was absent for the final vote of the Marriage and Civil Partnership (Scotland) Act 2014 due to a ministerial engagement, although he voted in favour of the bill in earlier stages. He also voted in favour of the Gender Recognition Reform (Scotland) Bill.

He supports Scotland becoming a republic stating "I believe we should be citizens first, not subjects."

Personal life
Yousaf was married to former SNP worker Gail Lythgoe from 2010 to 2016. In 2019, he married psychotherapist Nadia El-Nakla and has one child and one stepchild.

In November 2016, Yousaf was fined £300 and had six penalty points added to his driving licence, after being caught by police driving a friend's car without being insured to drive it. Yousaf accepted full responsibility, saying: "I totally accept the decision. I paid the fine and told my insurers about the points. This was an honest mistake, and the result of my personal circumstances during my separation."

He and his second wife made a complaint of discrimination against a Dundee children's nursery who did not offer a place to their daughter in 2021. The complaint was upheld by the Care Inspectorate who found that the nursery "did not promote fairness, equality and respect" in terms of its admission policy.

See also
 List of British Pakistanis
 List of ethnic minority politicians in the United Kingdom

Notes

References

External links 
Personal website
 

Scottish National Party profile

1985 births
Living people
People educated at Hutchesons' Grammar School
Alumni of the University of Glasgow
Scottish people of Pakistani descent
Scottish Muslims
Scottish National Party MSPs
Members of the Scottish Parliament 2011–2016
Members of the Scottish Parliament 2016–2021
Members of the Scottish Parliament 2021–2026
Members of the Scottish Cabinet
Ministers of the Scottish Government
British politicians of Pakistani descent
Former Presidents of GUMSA (Glasgow University Muslim Students Association)
Members of the Scottish Parliament for Glasgow constituencies